= Visualizing Belief and Piety in Iranian Shiism =

2010 non-fiction book by Ingvild Flaskerud

- Author: Ingvild Flaskerud
- Language: English
- Publisher: Continuum International Publishing Group
- Publication date: 2010
- Pages: 229
- ISBN: 978-1-441-14907-7

Visualizing Belief and Piety in Iranian Shiism is a non-fiction book by Ingvild Flaskerud about the practise of Shiism in Iran. It was published in 2010 by Continuum International Publishing Group.
